Malyukov (masculine) or Malyukova (feminine), also transliterated as Maliukov, is a Russian surname. Notable people with the surname include:

Aleksey Malyukov (born 1950), Russian hammer thrower and athletics coach
Oleg Malyukov (born 1965), Russian footballer and manager
Oleg Olegovich Malyukov (born 1985), Russian footballer and manager

Russian-language surnames